Elections to the French National Assembly were held in French Somaliland on 4 March 1973 as part of the wider French parliamentary elections. Omar Farah Iltireh was elected as the territory's MP.

Results

References

Afars
1973 in Afars and Issas
Elections in Djibouti
March 1973 events in Africa